Twelve Good Men is a 1936 British crime film directed by Ralph Ince and starring Henry Kendall, Nancy O'Neil and Joyce Kennedy. It was made at Teddington Studios by Warner Brothers as a quota quickie. It is based on the 1928 detective novel The Murders in Praed Street by John Rhode, with the principal series character of the book Doctor Priestley eliminated for the film.

Cast
 Henry Kendall as Charles Drew  
 Nancy O'Neil as Ann  
 Joyce Kennedy as Lady Thora  
 Percy Parsons as Hopwood  
 Morland Graham as Victor Day  
 Bernard Miles as Inspector Pine  
 Philip Ray as Higgs  
 Frederick Burtwell as Fortheringay  
 Roddy Hughes 
 Sam Springson
 George Hughes  
 Madge White 
 Grace Lane 
 Ralph Roberts

References

Bibliography
 Chibnall, Steve. Quota Quickies: The Birth of the British 'B' Film. British Film Institute, 2007.
 Low, Rachael. Filmmaking in 1930s Britain. George Allen & Unwin, 1985.
 Wood, Linda. British Films, 1927-1939. British Film Institute, 1986.

External links

1936 films
British crime drama films
1936 crime drama films
1930s English-language films
Films shot at Teddington Studios
Films directed by Ralph Ince
Warner Bros. films
British black-and-white films
Films based on British novels
Films set in London
Quota quickies
1930s British films